August von Gödrich (25 September 1859 – 16 March 1942) was a German racing cyclist.  He competed at the 1896 Summer Olympics in Athens.

Gödrich competed in the road race.  He placed second in the 87 kilometre race from Athens to Marathon and back, finishing in 3:42:18 behind Aristidis Konstantinidis of Greece.

References

External links

  (Excerpt available at )
 
 

1859 births
1942 deaths
Olympic cyclists of Germany
Cyclists at the 1896 Summer Olympics
19th-century sportsmen
German male cyclists
Olympic silver medalists for Germany
Moravian-German people
People from Fulnek
Olympic medalists in cycling
Medalists at the 1896 Summer Olympics
Sportspeople from the Moravian-Silesian Region